Riverview School District No. 407 is a public school district in King County, Washington, USA and contains within its boundaries, the communities of Duvall, Carnation, and the surrounding areas. At the end of the 2021-2022 school year, the district's enrollment was 3,065 students.

District boundary
It includes Carnation, Duvall, Lake Marcel-Stillwater, and portions of Ames Lake, Cottage Lake, and Union Hill-Novelty Hill.

Schools
Cedarcrest High School
Tolt Middle School
Cherry Valley Elementary School
Stillwater Elementary School
Carnation Elementary School
Eagle Rock Multi-Age Program
Riverview Learning Center (PARADE, CLIP, CHOICE)

History
In 1988, Tolt Junior/Senior High School split into Tolt Middle School and Tolt High School. The high school later closed when its replacement, Cedarcrest High School, opened in 1993. Tolt Middle School is still located on the original Tolt Junior/Senior High School campus.

References

External links

School districts in Washington (state)
Education in King County, Washington
1986 establishments in Washington (state)
School districts established in 1986